Hedong Township is a township under the administration of De'an County, in northern Jiangxi, China. , it has 2 residential communities and 4 villages under its administration.

References 

Township-level divisions of Jiangxi
De'an County